Dragon Lake is an unincorporated community just south of Quesnel named after the lake of the same name nearby.  It is one of the main commercial areas of Greater Quesnel, including a number of large shopping plazas and major supermarkets and big box stores.  The locality includes Dragon Lake Indian Reserve No. 3, one of the Indian Reserves of the Red Bluff First Nation.

References

Populated places on the Fraser River
Populated places in the Cariboo Regional District
Geography of the Cariboo
Unincorporated settlements in British Columbia